Daniel Lee Wall, Jr. (born September 7, 1953, Atlanta, Georgia, US) is an American jazz organist and pianist.

Wall was leading his own small group at Atlanta club the Carousel while still in high school. He attended the Berklee College of Music, then worked with Karl Ratzer from 1974 to 1977. Following this he played extensively with Jeremy Steig (1977-1982) and recorded with Ike Isaacs and Maxine Sullivan; he would also lead a trio with Isaacs and Steve Ellington during this time. In the 1980s he worked with Steve Grossman, Jimmy Madison, Henry Mancini, David Earle Johnson, and Eddie Gomez, and in the 1990s with John Abercrombie, Adam Nussbaum, Christoph Schweitzer, and Jerry Bergonzi. In addition to his work in pop and jazz idioms, he also does studio work for film scores and the advertising industry. He married singer Carol Veto in the 1980s; she sang in a group he led from 1985 to 1988.

Discography

As leader or co-leader
 Song for the Night (Landslide, 1980)
 Route Two (Landslide, 1981) 
 The Trio (Audiophile, 1982)
 While We're Young (ECM, 1993) 
 Speak of the Devil (ECM, 1994) 
 Tactics (ECM, 1997) 
 Golden Moments (Koch Jazz, 1997) 
 Off the Wall (Enja, 1997)
 On the Inside Looking In (Double-Time, 2000)

As sideman
With Jerry Bergonzi
 Just Within (Double-Time, 1997)
 Lost in the Shuffle (Double-Time, 1998) 
 Wiggy (Double-Time, 2000)
 A Different Look (Double-Time, 2001)

With Karl Ratzer
 Street Talk (Vanguard, 1979)
 Finger Prints (CMP, 1979) 
 Saturn Returning (Enja, 1997)

With Maxine Sullivan and Ike Isaacs
 Maxine Sullivan with the Ike Isaacs Quartet (Audiophile, 1981) 
 Enjoy Yourself! (Audiophile, 1986) 

With others
 John Abercrombie – Open Land (ECM, 1999) 
 Carl Verheyen, Karl Ratzer – Real to Reel (Dominant, 2000)

References
"Dan Wall". The New Grove Dictionary of Jazz. 2nd edition, ed. Barry Kernfeld.

External links
Dan Wall biography, discography and credits at Allmusic
Dan Wall discography, album releases & credits at Discogs

American jazz pianists
American male pianists
American jazz organists
American male organists
Musicians from Georgia (U.S. state)
American male jazz musicians